José Edmundo Ramírez Martínez (born 4 November 1968) is a Mexican politician affiliated with the Institutional Revolutionary Party. As of 2006 he served as Deputy of the LX Legislature of the Mexican Congress representing Hidalgo.

References

1968 births
Living people
Politicians from Hidalgo (state)
Institutional Revolutionary Party politicians
21st-century Mexican politicians
National Autonomous University of Mexico alumni
Members of the Congress of Hidalgo
People from Ixmiquilpan
Deputies of the LX Legislature of Mexico
Members of the Chamber of Deputies (Mexico) for Hidalgo (state)